Porcelain: A Memoir is a 2016 memoir by American house musician Moby. Covering his youth in the 1970s until his worldwide success in the late 1990s with Play, the book also discusses the author's spiritual struggles as a Christian, initial avoidance of and eventual recreational drug use, and interest in animal rights and veganism. The book has been met favorably by critics. He had plans for a future volume covering the following decade, which he eventually released in 2019 under the title Then It Fell Apart.

Plot
Chapters are centered around short stories, which Moby modeled after the sort of casual conversations that he would have at a bar, intending each one to end with a defined punch line. The book opens in 1976 with the author as a youth living with his mother in Darien and Stratford, Connecticut. After discussing some of his foundational memories of popular music, including Led Zeppelin and disco, the book jumps ahead to 1989, after he has been living in an abandoned factory for two years. He eventually ends up doing regular gigs DJing at New York house clubs such as Limelight and Mars and begins recording his first songs as Voodoo Child. The book follows his personal relationships and recording career as he tours internationally in the mid 1990s and eventually becomes famous with the release of Play in 1999.

Reception
The book has received positive reviews from critics and authors. Rock critic Greg Kot of the Chicago Tribune called the book "exceptional and incisive". The New York Journal of Books review by Paul LaRosa calls Moby a "shrewd, thoughtful, and insightful" author and ends, "This memoir has plenty of charm and if you grew up in the ’90s, this one’s for you. If not, well, it’s not THAT charming."

Music from Porcelain

To coincide with the release of the book, Moby assembled a compilation of songs he recorded during the period the book covers as well as a mixtape of others' music.

Track listing
Moby music
"Mobility"
"Go!" (woodtick mix)
"Ah Ah"
"Next Is the E"
"Rock the House"
"Thousand"
"Feeling So Real"
"God Moving Over the Face of the Waters"
"Come On Baby"
"That's When I Reach for My Revolver"
"Honey"
"Natural Blues"
"Bodyrock"
"Why Does My Heart Feel So Bad?"
"Porcelain"

More music
Raze – "Break 4 Love"
808 State – "Pacific State"
A Tribe Called Quest – "Scenario"
Precious – "Definition of a Track"
Jungle Brothers – "I’ll House You"
Audio 2 – "Top Billing"
Aly-us – "Follow Me"
Big Daddy Kane – "Raw"
Darryl McDaniels – "Pause"
Joey Beltram – "Energy Flash"
T.99 – "Anasthesia" (Out of History mix)
Dream Frequency – "Feel So Real"
Jaydee – "Plastic Dreams"
Strafe – "Set It Off"

References

External links

An extract from The Guardian
Audio interview for On Point
Audio interview with WBUR

2016 non-fiction books
American memoirs
Books by Moby
Show business memoirs
Books about Christianity
Memoirs about drugs
Penguin Press books